Abronia, the sand-verbenas or wild lantanas, is a genus of about 20 species of annual or perennial herbaceous plants in the family Nyctaginaceae. Despite the common names, they are not related to Verbena (vervains) or lantanas in the family Verbenaceae. They are closely allied with Tripterocalyx.

They are native to western North America, from Alberta and Saskatchewan, Canada, south to west Texas, California, Baja California and central Mexico, growing on dry sandy soils.  Abronia macrocarpa, a Texas endemic, is protected under the Endangered Species Act. Abronia ammophila, the Yellowstone sand verbena, is a plant unique to Yellowstone National Park's lakeshores and is endemic to the park.  Only a few species are widespread, and many are quite rare.  They make very attractive garden plants for hot, dry sandy sites.

Selected species

Formerly placed here
 Tripterocalyx carneus (Greene) L.A.Galloway (as A. carnea Greene)
 Tripterocalyx crux-maltae (Kellogg) Standl. (as A. crux-maltae Kellogg)
 Tripterocalyx micranthus (Torr.) Hook. (as A. micrantha Torr.)
 Tripterocalyx wootonii Standl. (as A. wootonii (Standl.) Tidestr.)

Cultivation and uses
The stout, sweet root of Abronia fragrans and Abronia latifolia, sometimes over 60 cm long, can be eaten as a root vegetable.

References

 Galloway, LA. 1976. Systematics of the North American desert species of Abronia and Tripterocalyx (Nyctaginaceae). Brittonia 27 (4): 328-347 (1975 publ. 1976)
 Flora of North America: Abronia

External links

 
Caryophyllales genera